Nesøya may refer to:

Nesøya, Akershus, an island in Asker municipality, Norway (just outside Oslo)
Nesøya, Nordland, an island in Rødøy municipality, Norway
Nesøya (Antarctica), an island in Antarctica